Mary Webb (1881–1927) was an English romantic novelist and poet of the early 20th century.

Mary Webb may also refer to:

 Mary Webb (artist) (born 1942), British abstract painter
 Mary Webb (cricketer) (born 1936), New Zealand player from 1957 to 1961
 Mary E. Webb (1827–1859), African American actress and orator
 Mary Estus Jones Webb, mayor of Baton Rouge 
 Mary Webb, Canadian national netball team manager in the 2010s

See also
Maria Webb (1804–873), Irish philanthropist and writer
Mary Webb School and Science College, Shropshire, England
 Thomas and Mary Webb House, a historic 1903 home in Lehi, Utah